De Bonte Hen (The Spotted Hen) is the name of an oil mill, located in the Zaanse Schans, Netherlands. De Bonte Hen is the northernmost of the mills in Zaanse Schans. 

The original mill was built in 1693. It was rebuilt In 1935 and restored in 1975. Since then, the mill has been operated weekly on a voluntary basis. It contains original oil cellars for the storage of oil made at the mill.

See also 
 De Gekroonde Poelenburg, Zaandam
 De Huisman, Zaandam
 De Kat, Zaandam
 De Os, Zaandam
 De Zoeker, Zaandam

External links 

 De Bonte Hen at the website of the Zaanse Schans
 De Bonte Hen at the website of 

Windmills in North Holland
Populated places in North Holland
Smock mills in the Netherlands
Grinding mills in the Netherlands
Windmills completed in 1693
Zaandam
1693 establishments in the Dutch Republic